CH Leganes was an ice hockey team in Leganés, Spain. They participated in the Superliga Espanola de Hockey Hielo for the 1985–86 season.

The club was founded in 1981, and began playing in the Segunda Division. In 1985, they were promoted to the Superliga, where the played one year. When Spanish hockey fell upon hard times in 1986, the club folded.

Ice hockey teams in Spain
Sport in Leganés
Ice hockey clubs established in 1981
Sports clubs disestablished in 1986